Edward Walter Clark III (1885 – November 16, 1939) was an investment banker with E. W. Clark & Co.

Biography
He was born in 1885 to Edward Walter Clark Jr. and Mary Newbold (Taylor) Clark. He graduated from Harvard University in 1907; the following year, he won golf's Presidents Cup (Harvard). During World War I, he served overseas with the Army Signal Corps.

He worked at E.W. Clark for 19 years. He also served for several years as a director of the Farmers National Bank of Bucks County, Pennsylvania, founded by a maternal great-grandfather.

References

1885 births
1939 deaths
E. W. Clark & Co.
Harvard University alumni
Clark banking family